Persoonia brachystylis is a species of flowering plant in the family Proteaceae and is endemic to a restricted area on the west coast of Western Australia. It is an erect, spreading shrub with smooth bark, narrow spatula-shaped to lance-shaped leaves and yellow flowers in groups of ten to twenty.

Description

Taxonomy
Persoonia brachystylis was first formally described in 1868 by Ferdinand von Mueller in his book Fragmenta Phytographiae Australiae from specimens collected by Augustus Frederick Oldfield near the Murchison River.

Distribution and habitat
This geebung is restricted to the Kalbarri National Park where it grows in low heath on sandplains, often over laterite.

References

brachystylis
Flora of Western Australia
Plants described in 1868
Taxa named by Ferdinand von Mueller